The men's 200m ind. medley SM7 event at the 2012 Summer Paralympics took place at the London Aquatics Centre on 2 September. There were two heats; the swimmers with the eight fastest times advanced to the final.

Results

Heats
Competed from 09:30.

Heat 1

Heat 2

Final
Competed at 17:30.

 
'Q = qualified for final. WR = World Record. AM = Americas Record. AS = Asian Record. OC = Oceania Record.  DSQ = Disqualified.

References
Official London 2012 Paralympics Results: Heats 
Official London 2012 Paralympics Results: Final 

Swimming at the 2012 Summer Paralympics